This is a list of fictional primates in film, and is a subsidiary to the list of fictional primates. The list is restricted to notable non-human characters from in film including monkeys, lemurs, chimpanzees, gorillas, orangutans, gibbons, and other primates.

See also

References

Film
Primates